Bolling Hall is a historic home located near Goochland, Goochland County, Virginia.  The original section was built before 1799 as a two-story, frame structure measuring 34 feet by 22 feet.  This was the main house of a property developed as a plantation. The house was expanded in 1803, and expanded again by 1815. It was extensively remodeled and expanded between 1845 and 1861.

The house was remodeled in 1947.  The home has a two-story, five-bay central section with flanking wings.

It was listed on the National Register of Historic Places in 1972.

References

Houses on the National Register of Historic Places in Virginia
Houses completed in 1861
Houses in Goochland County, Virginia
National Register of Historic Places in Goochland County, Virginia
1861 establishments in Virginia